The National Professional Soccer League was a professional indoor soccer league in the U.S. and Canada. It was originally called the American Indoor Soccer Association.

History
In November 1983, a Kalamazoo, Michigan-based group called Soccer Leagues Unlimited unveiled a plan for an indoor league composed exclusively of American players. The group's president, Bob Lemieux (later AISA commissioner), announced that Kalamazoo, Fort Wayne, Indiana, and Springfield, Illinois, were on board in what was he said was intended to be a sort of farm system, or developmental league, for the well established Major Indoor Soccer League. He added that groups in Indianapolis, Peoria, and Michigan cities, Saginaw and Flint; Kentucky cities, Lexington and Louisville; Ohio cities, Columbus Toledo and Dayton; Erie, PA; and Green Bay, Wisconsin, were all interested in joining the league.

Officially starting on April 18, 1984, the American Indoor Soccer Association's charter franchises were Chicago, Milwaukee, Kalamazoo and Fort Wayne; however, a Fort Wayne team did not materialize until the league's third season. Three other teams, Louisville, Canton and Columbus, all joined the league before the first season began in November 1984.

In 1990, the league changed its name to the National Professional Soccer League. Over its 17 seasons, a total of 30 franchises in 32 cities were part of the league at one time or another. During the summer of 2001, the league disbanded and the six surviving teams formed the second incarnation of the Major Indoor Soccer League.

When the league began in 1984, game rules were almost identical compared to the larger and more popular Major Indoor Soccer League. Beginning with the 1988–89 season, the AISA changed their scoring system. Goals were now worth 1, 2, or 3 points depending upon distance or game situation. Basically, all non-power play goals scored from inside the yellow line were worth 2 points while non-powerplay goals from outside the yellow line (50 feet from the goal line) were worth 3 points. Any power play goal was worth 1 point, as was any goal scored during a penalty shootout. Before the 1994–1995 season, the three-point line was changed to a 45-foot arc. Eventually, power play goals were worth either two or three points, but penalty shootouts were still kept at one point.

Teams

Champions by season

Championships won

Commissioners
Bob Lemieux 1984–1985
Joe Machnik 1985–1988
Steve M. Paxos 1988–2000
Steve Ryan 2000–2001

References

External links
All-Time NPSL Standings
All-Time NPSL Attendance
NPSL Yearly Awards
 National Professional Soccer League history – American Soccer History Archives

 
American Indoor Soccer Association
Defunct indoor soccer leagues in the United States
Defunct soccer leagues in Canada